Lawrence R. Yetka (October 1, 1924 – November 12, 2017) was an associate justice of the Minnesota Supreme Court and a member of the Minnesota House of Representatives.

Yetka was born in Cloquet, Minnesota. He graduated from the University of Minnesota Law School in 1948, and served in the Minnesota House of Representatives from 1951 to 1961.  He became a special municipal judge in 1961, and served until he became Cloquet City Attorney in 1964.

Yetka was appointed to the Supreme Court  in 1973 by Gov. Wendell Anderson, replacing Robert Sheran, who had been promoted to chief justice after the retirement of Chief Justice Oscar Knutson.  Yetka served on the Minnesota Supreme Court until his retirement in 1993. He died on November 12, 2017.

References

External documents

1924 births
2017 deaths
People from Cloquet, Minnesota
Justices of the Minnesota Supreme Court
Members of the Minnesota House of Representatives
University of Minnesota Law School alumni
20th-century American judges